Monument of the Great October Revolution is a bronze monument  dedicated to the October Revolution and establishment of the Soviet rule in Rostov-on-Don. Sculptor V. Dubovik and architect E. Polyanskiy created design of the sculptures of three men: a soldier, a seaman and a peasant. The peasant keeps the flag flying. The seaman take purchase on a rifle. The sculptures stands on the red granitical 4.5-metre pedestal. By design, general appearance of the monument symbolize steadfastness of the triumph of the Revolution. The sculpture composition was opened in 1979. It is located at the spot where a rally for establishment of the Soviet rule in the city took place on October 26 1917. The front of the base carries a bronze plaque reminding about this event:

Historical background 
After the triumph of the February Revolution the broad Bolshevik's political activities began in the Don region. Nashe znamya "Our standard" newspaper explained bolshevik policies and its objectives, strengthened, expanded party organizations, prepared toiling masses to a communist revolution. Rostov-Nakhichevan committee of the Bolsheviks contacted other Don bolshevik groups, helped to constitute new groups, strengthen current party organisations and strengthen political work to earn the trust of the masses through the newspaper.

The number of armed groups of workers has increased every day. Workers with the support of peasants and revolutionary soldiers were ready to advocate overthrow of the Russian Provisional Government. After obtain information about triumph of the communist revolution in Petrograd and proclamation the Soviet power of workers and peasants Rostov-Nakhichevan committee  organized a council of Workers' and Soldiers' Deputies on October 26 1917. The council decided to take full power and constitute a Military-Revolutionary Committee led by Sergey Syrtsov contrary to violent resistance from the Mensheviks and the Socialist Revolutionary Party. After the session the rally of workers and the soldier took place in a city garden near a rotunda. Numerous participants supported the revolution and  agreed to provide the needed approval to the council and the Military-Revolutionary Committee. The monument had been built to commemorate this huge milestone.

References 

Outdoor sculptures in Russia
1979 sculptures
Statues in Russia
Bronze sculptures in Russia
Sculptures of men in Russia
Monuments and memorials in Rostov-on-Don